Newton Suites is a residential skyscraper in Newton Road, Singapore designed by WOHA Architects. It has a height of 120 metres with 36 floors. Each floor has two two-bedroom and two three-bedroom apartments. The top floor contains two penthouses. The building features several sky gardens. The condominium has a security post, basement car park and a swimming pool.

References
 Developers Website of Newton Suites

Residential buildings completed in 2007
Residential skyscrapers in Singapore
Apartment buildings in Singapore
WOHA